Xinghua Subdistrict is a subdistrict of Wanbailin District, Taiyuan, Shanxi, People's Republic of China. , it has ten residential communities (社区) under its administration.

See also
List of township-level divisions of Shanxi

References

Township-level divisions of Shanxi